Tulishi (Kuntulishi, Thulishi, Tulesh) is a Kadu language spoken in Kordofan. Dialects are Tulishi proper and Kamdang.

Dialects and locations
Ethnologue (22nd edition) lists dialects as:
Tulishi, Kamda (Kamdang)
Dar El Kabira (Logoke, Minjimmina, Truj, Turuj)

The Dar el Kabira and Kamdang dialects are reportedly similar.

Villages are Aabiisa, Aliyooro Manadaha, Jebels Tulishi, Kamdang, Kirakaati, Laati, Lawwa, Nattilongke, Ntukungnge, and Thudhi in South Kordofan state.

References

External links
 Tulishi basic lexicon at the Global Lexicostatistical Database

Languages of Sudan
Kadu languages
Severely endangered languages